"Release Me" is a song by the Belgian band Hooverphonic. It would have represented Belgium in the Eurovision Song Contest 2020. The song was released as a digital download on 17 February 2020.

Eurovision Song Contest

The song would have represented Belgium in the Eurovision Song Contest 2020, after Hooverphonic was internally selected by the national broadcaster VRT. On 28 January 2020, a special allocation draw was held which placed each country into one of the two semi-finals, as well as which half of the show they would perform in. Belgium was placed into the first semi-final, to be held on 12 May 2020, and was scheduled to perform in the second half of the show.

Charts

Release history

References

2020 singles
2020 songs
Eurovision songs of 2020
Eurovision songs of Belgium
Hooverphonic songs
Songs written by Alex Callier